The 2010 FIA WTCC Race of Italy (formally the 2010 FIA WTCC Yokohama Race of Italy) was the third round of the 2010 World Touring Car Championship season and the sixth running of the FIA WTCC Race of Italy. It was held at the Autodromo Nazionale di Monza, in Monza, Italy on 23 May 2010. The two races were won by Andy Priaulx for BMW Team RBM and Yvan Muller for Chevrolet RML.

Background
After the second round of the season in Morocco, defending champion Gabriele Tarquini was leading the drivers' standings by seven points over Yvan Muller. Franz Engstler was leading the Yokohama Independents' Trophy.

Kristian Poulsen returned to the championship with his self–run Poulsen Motorsport team. He last raced with Liqui Moly Team Engstler at the 2009 Guia Race of Macau. Meanwhile Scuderia Proteam Motorsport added a third BMW 320si to their team for Italian driver Fabio Fabiani. Chevrolet Motorsport Sweden joined the grid for the Italian round, running a Chevrolet Cruze LT for TC 2000 Championship driver Leonel Pernía who became the first Argentine to race in the World Touring Car Championship.

Report

Testing and free practice
BMW Team RBM driver Augusto Farfus was the fastest driver in Friday's test session, beating the Chevrolet of Muller and the SEAT of Tom Coronel. Championship leader Tarquini was fourth and Pernía was thirteenth on his first run in a Super 2000 car. Priaulx suffered a brake disk failure at the end of the pit straight and nearly collided with Alain Menu while Fredy Barth, Sergio Hernández and Mehdi Bennani all saw reduced running due to technical issues.

Tarquini topped the times in the first practice session on Saturday morning, two–tenths of a second ahead of Priaulx. Jordi Gené was third and Robert Huff was the fastest Chevrolet in fourth. Andrei Romanov required an engine change and as a result incurred a ten–place grid penalty for race one.

Chevrolet were fastest in the final practice session with Huff beating the BMW of Priaulx by less than a tenth of a second. Morning pace setter Tarquini was third while Huff's teammates Menu and Muller were fourth and fifth respectively.

Qualifying
Tarquini was fastest in Q1 for SR-Sport, ahead of the Chevrolet pairing of Huff and Muller. In Q2 the diesel-powered SEATs followed each other round the circuit to use teamwork and slipstreaming to get good times. However, Tarquini ran wide at the second Lesmo with Barth also following him into the dirt. This ruined their laptimes, resulting in the BMWs and Chevrolets locking out the first two rows of the grid, with Augusto Farfus on pole position ahead of Huff, Priaulx, Menu and Muller. Gené was the first SEAT in 6th, with Tarquini in 7th.

Warm-Up
Priaulx topped the Sunday morning warm–up session with pole sitter and teammate Farfus fourth. Pernía and Hernández had problems meaning they couldn't set competitive lap times.

Race One
Huff moved past polesitter Farfus at the start of Race One. Tarquini, meanwhile, moved from seventh to second in the run to the first chicane. Behind, many drivers cut across the grass at the chicane, while Kristian Poulsen and Darryl O'Young collided, both limping back to the pits to retire. Tarquini passed Huff at the start of the second lap and the pair began to stretch the gap back to third-placed Priaulx. However, on the final lap, Tarquini suffered a front-left puncture on the run down to the Ascari chicane. As Huff moved out to pass him, he also suffered a front-left puncture. The pair limped down the following straight, with Priaulx and the following pack closing them down. However, the leading pair could not be passed initially, with yellow flags out at the beginning of the Parabolica after Leonel Pernía had slid into the gravel on the previous lap. Once the green flags were shown, Priaulx and Farfus passed the slowing Tarquini and then Huff, to take a dramatic one-two finish for BMW. Behind, Michel Nykjær had also suffered a puncture. Huff limped past the line to finish third, ahead of Muller, Coronel and Barth. Tarquini and Nykjær finished seventh and eighth, ahead of Tiago Monteiro and Bennani. Bennani however was given a 30-second penalty after the race for cutting the first chicane on the opening lap, handing tenth place and a first Independents' Trophy victory to Harry Vaulkhard.

Race Two
Nykjær made a good start from pole position in Race Two, while Muller moved up from fifth to second before the first chicane. Tarquini regained second from Muller and briefly took the lead of the race from Nykjær. Tarquini was then awarded a drive-through penalty for creeping forward on the grid before the lights had gone out. Bennani was also given a penalty having made a much more obvious jump start. Before Tarquini could serve his penalty though, he was re-passed by Nykjær at the first chicane. The Dane led the race until the last lap when he suffered a puncture, pulling off the track and retiring at the second chicane. This handed Muller the victory, ahead of Coronel, Huff, Farfus and Priaulx. Having served his drive-through penalty, Tarquini returned to the pits to retire on the following lap.

Results

Qualifying

Race 1

Bold denotes Fastest lap.

Race 2

Bold denotes Fastest lap.

Standings after the event

Drivers' Championship standings

Yokohama Independents' Trophy standings

Manufacturers' Championship standings

 Note: Only the top five positions are included for both sets of drivers' standings.

References

Results Booklet PDF at MST Systems

External links
World Touring Car Championship official website

Italy
FIA WTCC Race of Italy